The Frodeåsen Tunnel is a  long twin-tube, four lane road tunnel in Tønsberg, Norway. Part of County Road 300, it runs through Frodeåsen between Kjelle and Velle north of the city center. Built as part of the Tønsberg Package, construction started on 28 October 2004 and the breakthrough was made on 9 March 2006. The tunnel and the new County Road 300 opened on 13 March 2008, creating a bypass road north of the town of Tønsberg.

References

Road tunnels in Vestfold og Telemark
Tønsberg
Tunnels completed in 2008
2008 establishments in Norway